Mr. Wonderful is the second studio album by American hip hop recording artist Action Bronson, released on March 23, 2015, by Vice Records and Atlantic Records. The album is Bronson's first for a major label, after signing to Atlantic and Vice, in August 2012. It was preceded by several mixtapes and EPs, including the Blue Chips series and Saaab Stories (2013).

The album, recorded throughout 2014, was produced by several high-profile record producers, such as The Alchemist, Mark Ronson and Noah "40" Shebib. The album has guest appearances by Chance the Rapper, Meyhem Lauren, Chauncy Sherod, Party Supplies and Big Body Bes. Upon its release, Mr. Wonderful received generally positive reviews from music critics, who praised Bronson's lyricism and production choices. The album debuted at number seven on the US  Billboard 200 and was supported by four singles: "Easy Rider", "Actin Crazy", "Terry" and "Baby Blue".

Background
Bronson began attracting major attention after collaborations with American music producers, Statik Selektah (Well-Done) and The Alchemist (Rare Chandeliers). In August 2012, Bronson signed a recording contract with the Warner Bros. Records and Atlantic Records' imprint Vice Records. His first release for Vice was an extended play (EP) titled Saaab Stories, released on June 11, 2013. After announcing the title of his first studio album for Vice, in May 2014, Bronson spoke with New Musical Express about the album, "The album is sounding incredible. The whole album is a standout. I don't care about individual songs, I'm trying to make a complete, classic project. I just do my music uninfluenced by anybody else, or current trends, and it comes together at the end. Nothing needs to have a fucking theme all the time. This is just rap. I'm not trying to make people think I'm some sort of scientific wizard or inspirational poet. Fuck that! It's just happy, funny, rugged, rough rap." On November 24, 2014, Bronson revealed he had finished recording the album.

Release and promotion
On May 16, 2014, Bronson announced the title of the album in a Twitter update, when he tweeted: "MY ALBUM BEEN NAMED. THE ONLY THING TO DESCRIBE ME.. MR. WONDERFUL. THATS BEEN ME SINCE I STEPPED IN THIS BULLSHIT.." On November 28, 2014, Bronson revealed there would be a worldwide concert tour upon the album's release. On December 24, 2014, he took to Twitter to reveal the album would have guest appearances by Meyhem Lauren, Big Body Bes, Party Supplies, Chauncy Sherod and Chance the Rapper. Later that day, after exposing several fake track lists, Bronson tweeted 13 song titles, unveiling the album's official track listing. On January 7, 2015, Bronson revealed the album would be released on March 24. The following day, after releasing a song from the album titled "Actin Crazy", Bronson posted which artists would be featured on which song. On January 14, 2015, Bronson made an appearance on the New York City radio station Hot 97's Funkmaster Flex show, to promote Mr. Wonderful and performed a freestyle, which prompted Flex to declare Bronson the "nicest in the game right now".  On March 11, 2015, Bronson announced on Twitter that his album would be released one day sooner than originally scheduled.

Singles
On August 5, 2014, Bronson released "Easy Rider" as the album's first single. The song was produced by Bronson's long time producer Party Supplies. On August 20, 2014, the music video for "Easy Rider", directed by Tom Gould, was released. The video pays homage to the 1969 Peter Fonda/Dennis Hopper film Easy Rider. After premiering the song on January 7, 2015, Bronson officially released "Actin Crazy", via digital distribution, as the album's second single on January 20, 2015. On February 16, 2015, "Terry" was released as the third single alongside the pre-order for the album. On March 3, 2015, "Baby Blue" was released as the album's fourth single. The song features Chicago-bred recording artist Chance the Rapper. Bronson confirmed on Twitter that they were pushing this single to radio stations and that they were filming a music video for the song.

Critical reception

Mr. Wonderful received positive reviews from music critics. At Metacritic, which assigns a normalized rating out of 100 to reviews from critics, the album received an average score of 77, which indicates "generally favorable reviews", based on 17 reviews. Writing for Exclaim!, Samantha O'Connor noted that Bronson has become "a more serious artist focused on experimentation" with the record, further noting that the project's "varying production clashes throughout the disorganized project." Jay Balfour of HipHopDX said, "Tellingly and thankfully, the most out-of-pocket moves on Mr. Wonderful aren’t uncharacteristic appeals to radio but cases of its artist leaning further into the territory he’s been hinting at. Unlike the rest of his albums and mixtapes up to this point though, Mr. Wonderful is a multi-producer affair and it jumps around noticeably as a result."

Kellan Miller of XXL said, "But aside from a few problematic miscues, the majority of Mr. Wonderful can be maneuvered without the skip button in tow, culminating in "Easy Rider," a fittingly assertive statement realized through unfurled rhymes that don't require a chorus to stick in the imagination. Unshaved, donned in sweatpants, and with a compelling major label debut to his credit, Action Bronson is appropriately attired as hip-hop's latest star." Colin Fitzgerald of PopMatters said, "Mr. Wonderful may not come off as the sweeping epic its coda hints at, but it's an entertaining and unique experience that only Bronson could give us. Few rap albums can be this different and still satisfying."

Commercial performance
The album debuted at number 7 on the US Billboard 200, his total sales accounted for 48,540 streams and sales (43,564 traditional album sales).  It was the third highest selling album in the United States that week.

Track listing

Notes
  signifies a co-producer

Personnel
Credits for Mr. Wonderful adapted from AllMusic.

88-Keys – producer
Action Bronson – executive producer, rapping
The Alchemist – engineer, producer
AntMan Wonder – musician
Antoine "Audioblk" Baldwin – producer
Big Body Bes – featured artist
Nick Bilardello – package design
BlackAtlass – featured artist
Tommy "TNT" Brenneck – guitar
Sidney "Omen" Brown – producer
Noel Cadastre – engineer
Curt Chambers – guitar
Chance the Rapper – featured artist, backing vocals
Ricky Damien – engineer
Ezra Dowery – featured artist
Rhys Downing – engineer
Tom Elmhirst – mixing
Nick Hook – engineer
Leon Kelly – assistant
Dave Kutch – mastering
Meyhem Lauren – featured artist
Gloria Lovett – vocals
Zane Lowe – backing vocals
Leon Michels – engineer, Mellotron, vibraphone
Richard "FRKO" Montgomery – art direction, illustrations
Riggs Morales – A&R
Justin Nealis – engineer, mixing
Joya Nemley – A&R
Oh No – producer
Party Supplies – featured artist, guitar, producer
Mark Ronson – bass, drums, Fender Rhodes, guitar, piano, producer, programming, scratching
Andrew Sarlo – engineer
Gabriel Schuman – assistant
Noah Shebib – engineer, mixing, producer
Chauncy Sherrod – featured artist, vocals
Justin Smith – mastering
Statik Selektah – engineer, mixing, producer, programming
Evan Stewart – engineer
Jared Tauben – engineer
Carolyn Tracey – package production
Donnie trumpet – trumpet
Cas Weinbren – piano
Ryan West – mixing
Danny Zook – sample clearance

Charts

Weekly charts

Year-end charts

References

2015 albums
Action Bronson albums
Atlantic Records albums
Albums produced by 88-Keys
Albums produced by the Alchemist (musician)
Albums produced by Mark Ronson
Albums produced by Noah "40" Shebib
Albums produced by Oh No (musician)
Albums produced by Statik Selektah